Doña Perfecta is a 1951 Mexican film version of the famous novel by Benito Pérez Galdós, directed by Alejandro Galindo and starring Dolores del Río.

Plot summary
The action occurs in 19th century México, when a young liberal named Don José (Pepe) Rey, arrives in a city, with the intention of marrying his cousin Rosario. This was a marriage of convenience arranged between Pepe's father Juan and Juan's sister, Perfecta (Dolores del Río).

Upon getting to know each other, Pepe and Rosario declare their eternal love, but in steps Don Inocencio, the cathedral canon, who meddles and obstructs the marriage as well as the good intentions of Doña Perfecta and her brother Don Juan. Over the course of time, several events lead up to a confrontation between Pepe Rey and his aunt Perfecta, which is caused by her refusal to allow Pepe and Rosario to marry, because Pepe is a non-believer.

Cast
 Dolores del Río... Doña Perfecta
 Carlos Navarro ... Pepe
 Esther Fernández ... Rosario
 Julio Villarreal ... Don Inocencio

Comments
Adapted from Doña Perfecta, the novel of Benito Perez Galdos, the plot is moved to Mexico nineteenth century mired in dispute between liberal and conservative ideals that erupted during Guerra de Reforma.
This film ranks' 29 in the list of The 100 best films of Mexican cinema, in the opinion of 25 critics and specialists, published by the magazine SOMOS in July 1994.

References

External links

1951 films
1950s historical films
Mexican historical films
Films set in the 19th century
Mexican black-and-white films
Films based on works by Benito Pérez Galdós
1950s Spanish-language films
1950s Mexican films